Entourage is a 2015 American comedy film written, directed and produced by Doug Ellin, and serves as a continuation of the HBO television series of the same name. It stars the principal cast of the show, Kevin Connolly, Adrian Grenier, Kevin Dillon, Jerry Ferrara and Jeremy Piven, and follows actor Vincent Chase, who goes over budget on his directorial debut and must ask newly appointed studio head Ari Gold for more money. Like in the series, many celebrity sportspeople and actors appear as themselves, while several supporting cast members from the show reprise their roles.

After it was confirmed the series would end in 2011 with season 8, Ellin and the cast expressed their interest in doing a feature film. After script and production issues, the project was officially announced in 2013, and filming began around Los Angeles in February 2014.

Entourage was theatrically released in the United States on June 3, 2015. The film received generally negative reviews from critics and grossed $49 million worldwide, against a production cost of $39 million.

Plot 
Just nine days after the finale of the show, Vincent Chase has separated from his wife and throws a party on his yacht, with his friends E, Johnny and Turtle joining to cheer him up.  Wishing to do something new with his career, he calls his former agent-turned-studio head Ari Gold, who offers Vince a leading role in his first studio production. Vince says he will only star in it if he directs. Eight months later, Hyde, the directorial debut by Vince, is in the middle of post-production and is over budget by $15 million. Needing more money, Vince asks Ari if they can get an additional $10 million to complete the movie. Reluctant, but wanting to please him, Ari flies to Texas to meet the co-financiers of the movie, Larsen McCredle and his son Travis, to convince them to invest more money into the film. Hesitant, Larsen sends Travis with Ari back to Los Angeles to see a cut of the film at Vince's private screening.

Vince has second thoughts on the rough cut and cancels the screening out of fear no one will enjoy it. He later gives Ari and Travis a copy of the movie for their viewing. Ari and Travis enjoy the movie but Travis requests that Ari cut the scenes with Vince's brother, Johnny "Drama" Chase, out of the movie or he will not give the film the extra money. With Ari giving him no answer, Travis puts the post-production on hold. Vince and Eric "E" Murphy visit Travis to come up with a solution, but this results in Travis saying he did not like Vince's performance either and wants the entire movie to be redone with a new lead and director. In addition, studio CEO John Ellis removes Ari from the production.

The boys soon realize the reason Travis is angry over the movie is that he discovered that Vince is secretly dating Emily Ratajkowski, whom Travis is infatuated with. Learning of this, Ari interrupts Ellis in a boardroom meeting with Larsen and Travis with this information. Surprised, Larsen says he will stay behind the movie but mandates the condition that Ari is no longer working for the studio because, although he agreed his son was being juvenile, Ari had disrespected his son. During this time, the boys are at the hospital as E's ex-fiancée Sloan goes into labor. Sloan gives birth to a girl, Ryan Murphy, resulting in Sloan and E deciding to get back together and vowing to make it work this time.

As the boys celebrate, Ari arrives at the hospital and announces that he resigned, and in lieu of his severance, he has negotiated part of the backend grosses. Hyde becomes a box office hit, grossing over $450 million worldwide. At the Golden Globe Awards, Drama ends up winning the award for Best Supporting Actor. Stunned, Drama goes to accept the award and is silent for a moment before yelling his trademark Viking Quest phrase, "VICTORY!!!"

In a mid-credits scene, Ari's former assistant Lloyd has his wedding and Ari gives him away. When the group gets together for a picture, Billy Walsh suggests that they should make a film (or TV show) about the lives of Vince and the gang.

Cast 

 Kevin Connolly as Eric Murphy
 Jeremy Piven as Ari Gold
 Adrian Grenier as Vincent Chase
 Kevin Dillon as Johnny "Drama" Chase
 Jerry Ferrara as Salvatore "Turtle" Assante
 Emmanuelle Chriqui as Sloan McQuewick
 Perrey Reeves as Melissa Gold
 Rex Lee as Lloyd Lee
 Debi Mazar as Shauna Roberts
 Rhys Coiro as Billy Walsh
 Constance Zimmer as Dana Gordon
 Haley Joel Osment as Travis McCredle
 Ronda Rousey as herself
 Scott Mescudi as Allen, Ari's assistant
 Alan Dale as John Ellis
 Billy Bob Thornton as Larsen McCredle
 Nora Dunn as Dr. Marcus
 Sabina Gadecki as Melanie
 Alice Eve as Sophia
 Martin Landau as Bob Ryan
 Dan Patrick as Stooge
 Judy Greer as Casting Director

Cameos
The following portray fictionalized versions of themselves:

 Jessica Alba
 Lisa-Marie Richardson
 Nina Agdal
 David Arquette
 Shayna Baszler
 Tom Brady
 Warren Buffett
 Gary Busey
 Andrew Dice Clay
 Linda Cohn
 Tameka Cottle
 Common
 Mark Cuban
 Baron Davis
 Jessamyn Duke
 Julian Edelman
 David Faustino
 Jon Favreau
 Kelsey Grammer
 Jim Gray
 Rob Gronkowski
 Armie Hammer
 Ronda Rousey 
 Calvin Harris
 Thierry Henry
 Terrence J
 Cynthia Kirchner
 Matt Lauer
 Greg Louganis
 Chad Lowe
 Clay Matthews III
 Maria Menounos
 Alyssa Miller
 Piers Morgan
 Liam Neeson
 Ed O'Neill
 Emily Ratajkowski
 Mike Richards
 Stevan Ridley 
 Bob Saget
 Saigon
 Richard Schiff
 David Spade
 George Takei
 T.I.
 Steve Tisch
 Steve Nash
 Mike Tyson
 Mark Wahlberg
 Pharrell Williams
 Russell Wilson

Production 
In August 2010, when it was confirmed that the eighth season of Entourage would be the last, creator Doug Ellin expressed interest in writing a film after the series ended. In September 2011, Adrian Grenier confirmed that there would be a film, and a script just needed to be written first. The series' executive producer Mark Wahlberg also confirmed that a film is in the works and said, "I will do everything to get this film made".

The film was officially green-lit in 2013, with Ellin directing and Warner Bros. distributing. However, by September 2013, amid reports that there had been significant delays in production and contract issues with the film's cast, Ellin stated the film was "less and less likely every day." However, by October 2013, the cast had reached a deal, allowing the film to move forward.

Principal photography officially began on February 19, 2014, in Los Angeles, with additional filming in Miami. While filming in California, the production spent $39 million and received the California Film & Television Tax Credit. Filming was disrupted when Kevin Connolly broke his leg filming a football scene with Russell Wilson, which resulted in a number of script changes to accommodate it. In March 2014, it was reported that adult film actresses Lilly Banks, Maia Davis, Spencer Scott, and Anna Morna had shot scenes for the film. Several cast members shot a scene for the film on the red carpet at the 72nd Golden Globe Awards on January 11, 2015.

Release
The film was previously set for a June 12, 2015 release, but on October 24, 2014, Warner Bros. moved it up a week to June 5, 2015. In April 2015, the release date was moved up two days to June 3, 2015.

Reception

Box office
Entourage grossed $32.4 million in the United States and Canada and $16.9 million in other territories for a worldwide total of $49.3 million, against a production budget of $39 million.

In North America, the film grossed $2 million from its early Tuesday night showings and $5.4 million on its opening day (Wednesday), including Tuesday previews, from 3,058 theaters. The film earned $2 million and $3.7 million on Thursday and Friday, respectively. For its opening weekend (Friday–Sunday), it grossed $10.4 million (a five-day total of $17.8 million), finishing at fourth place at the box office behind Spy ($29.1 million), San Andreas ($25.8 million), and Insidious: Chapter 3 ($22.7 million). Given the film's $39 million production budget, as well as an additional $40.7 million spent on advertisement, Warner Bros. and HBO Films were hoping for an opening of at least $20 million, and the film was considered a financial disappointment. The film dropped 59% in its sophomore weekend to $4.2 million, finishing 5th.

In Australia, the film opened at number one, earning $2.6 million.

Critical response
On review aggregator website Rotten Tomatoes, the film holds an approval rating of 33% based on 213 reviews, with an average rating of 4.70/10. The site's critical consensus reads, "Entourage retains many elements of the HBO series, but feels less like a film than a particularly shallow, cameo-studded extended episode of the show." On Metacritic, the film has a weighted average score of 38 out of 100, based on 40 critics, indicating "generally unfavorable reviews". In CinemaScore polls, audiences gave the film an average grade of "A−" on an A+ to F scale.

Brian Tallerico, writing for RogerEbert.com, awarded the film one and a half out of four stars, saying "Instead of challenging his characters or giving them something new to do, Ellin just high fives them on the way to the winner's circle." Mark Kermode, writing for The Guardian, gave the film one out of five stars, and wrote that "The Human Centipede was more sensitively attuned to issues of gender politics. And it had better jokes. Even producer/inspiration Marky Mark [Mark Wahlberg] looks embarrassed by his cameo." Ultimately, Kermode would rank Entourage as the worst film of 2015  and later, in 2018, the worst film of the decade to that point.  IGN awarded Entourage a 7.5 out of 10, saying "When it sticks to what it has always been best at, the relationship of these four friends, it is as good as the series ever was".

References

External links 

Entourage (American TV series)
2015 films
2015 comedy-drama films
American comedy-drama films
Cultural depictions of Jessica Alba
Cultural depictions of Mark Wahlberg
Dune Entertainment films
Films about Hollywood, Los Angeles
Films based on television series
Films directed by Doug Ellin
Films produced by Mark Wahlberg
Films set in California
Films shot in Los Angeles
Films shot in Miami
Warner Bros. films
2010s English-language films
2010s American films